Thomas Becton (1878–11 August 1957) was a professional footballer, who played in The Football League for Preston North End, New Brighton Tower and Sunderland, as well as playing professionally for a number of teams outside the Football League.

Becton was a forward, who played in the inside left and outside left positions, starting out with his home town club, Preston North End. He moved to the now-defunct New Brighton Tower in 1898, and to Sunderland a year later. Following this he played for a series of non-Football League clubs, starting with Kettering Town in 1900. He moved to Southern League side Bristol Rovers in 1901, before returning to Kettering after a year.

He went on to play for Oswaldtwistle Rovers and Colne, and ended his career playing with Rossendale United.

References

1878 births
1957 deaths
Footballers from Preston, Lancashire
English footballers
Association football forwards
English Football League players
Southern Football League players
Preston North End F.C. players
New Brighton Tower F.C. players
Sunderland A.F.C. players
Kettering Town F.C. players
Bristol Rovers F.C. players
Colne F.C. players
Rossendale United F.C. players
Oswaldtwistle Rovers F.C. players